Tizabad (also Romanized as Tīzābād) is a village in Tujerdi Rural District, Sarchehan District, Bavanat County, Fars Province, Iran. At the 2006 census, its population was 21, in 6 families.

References 

Populated places in Sarchehan County